Saman Bank (Bank Saman) is a privately owned Iranian bank. It is listed on the Tehran Stock Exchange

History
This bank started its activities as Credit Institution in September 1999. Subsequently, in August 2002, it received a full banking license and changed its name to Saman Bank. Saman Eqtesad Credit Corporation was established on September 23, 1999 with a share capital of 11 bln Iranian Rials (US$1.4m).
It opened its first branch on November 22, 1999 and managed to achieve in its first year of activity a 5% return on equity. In 2002, Saman was the third private financial institution in post-revolutionary Iran to receive a banking license. In this context, the share capital increased to Rials 220 bln (US$26 mln).

As of May 2018, the bank had 174 branches in Iran (81 branches in Tehran and 68 branches in other cities).

In March 2007, Saman Bank had a paid-sup share capital of Rials 900 bln (US$97 mln). It operates 149 branches across Iran.
Saman Bank also launched the first internet banking service in Iran, and has since been at the forefront of expansion and enhancement of electronic banking.

Saman Financial Group
In addition to Saman Bank, the Saman Financial Group includes a further eight subsidiary companies that it has launched or acquired a substantial stake in during 2003–2012.

 Saman Kish Electronic Payment 
 Saman Satellite Communications Group (Saman SCG)
 Saman Exchange 
 Saman Insurance 
 Saman Brokerage
Iranian Credit Bureau & Scoring
 Saman Processing 
 Aftab Tejarat Saman Servicing
 Kardan Investment Bank

Achievements
Saman Bank’s campaign of “There is water, yet very little!” won Sarv-e Zarbin award for the best commercial graphic design in the Fourth Sarv-e Noghrei Biennial.

Sponsorship

Saman Bank was a 2013-2016 sponsor of Iran Volleyball Teams & Federation.

See also

Banking and insurance in Iran
Economy of Iran
List of banks in Iran

References

External links
 
 View Annual Report 2009 of BEESaman Bank

Banks of Iran
Banks established in 2002
Companies listed on the Tehran Stock Exchange
Iranian companies established in 2002